This is a list of ambassadors of the United States to Togo.

Until 1955 French Togoland was a United Nations Trust Territory mandated by the U.N. to France. In 1955, French Togoland became the administrative Republic of Togo within the French Community (Communauté française), although it retained its UN trusteeship status. In 1960 Togo severed its constitutional ties with France, shed its UN trusteeship status, and became fully independent as the Togolese Republic.

The United States immediately recognized Togo and moved to establish diplomatic relations. The State Department established an embassy in Yaoundé in nearby Cameroon on January 1, 1960, with Bolard More as Chargé d'affaires ad interim. The Yaoundé embassy was simultaneously accredited to Togo. The embassy in Lomé was established on April 27, 1960, with Jesse M. MacKnight as Chargé d’Affaires ad interim. On June 23, 1960, Leland Barrows was appointed as Ambassador Extraordinary and Plenipotentiary to Cameroon with separate accreditation to Togo while remaining resident in Yaoundé. In 1961 a separate ambassador was appointed solely for Togo and resident at Lomé. The United States has maintained diplomatic relations with Togo since that date.

The United States Embassy in Togo is located in Lomé. The current Togolese ambassador to the United States is Limbiye Edawe Kadangha Bariki.

Ambassadors

Notes

See also
Togo – United States relations
Foreign relations of Togo
Ambassadors of the United States

References
U.S. Embassy in Lomé: Ambassador’s biography
United States Department of State: Background notes on Togo

External links
 United States Department of State: Chiefs of Mission for Togo
 United States Department of State: Togo
 United States Embassy in Lomé

Togo

United States